Ferhan Hasani (born 18 June 1990), nicknamed Buba, is a Macedonian professional footballer who plays for Shkëndija.

He made his full international debut on 22 December 2010 against China in a friendly game. He represented the nation at UEFA Euro 2020, their first major tournament.

Personal life
Hasani was born in Tetovo, Macedonia and he is Albanian. As a child, Hasani grew up with the nickname Buba because he was quicker on the ball than his peers. Hasani joined Shkëndija at the age of 8.

Club career

Shkëndija
When Shkëndija were in the Macedonian Second League, Hasani got his chance to play for the senior squad when he was 17 years old. In the second of his two seasons with the senior squad, Hasani scored 13 goals in 27 matches, establishing himself as best striker in the team and an important contributor to Shkëndija's championship 2010–11 season, earning Shkëndija promotion to the Macedonian First League. He became a fan favourite by scoring a goal from a free kick against rivals FK Vardar in the final game of the season. During the half time of the game against Metalurg, Hasani was presented as the best player of the season.

There was some speculation that Croatian club Hajduk Split and German club VfL Wolfsburg, were interested in signing the striker, as well as Dutch side FC Groningen and Gent of Belgium. However, Hasani remained at Shkendija for the first half of the new season. The season started well until he suffered an injury that kept him out of the squad until the latter half of the year. Hasani contributed five goals and eight assists for his club that season before leaving in the winter break.

VfL Wolfsburg
On 16 December 2011, Hasani agreed to a three-year deal with Wolfsburg and joined the German club immediately after the New Year. Wolfsburg manager, Felix Magath, stated that new acquisitions Hasani and Slobodan Medojević were "two young players who have played exceptionally well in their respective leagues and are talents from whose we expect to be great players".

On 30 September 2012, Hasani made his debut for Wolfsburg, coming on in the 45th minute against Mainz 05.

During the 2012–13 season's winter transfer period, Hasani received interest from Croatian club Dinamo Zagreb. It was reported that Wolfsburg and Dinamo have agreed terms and all that remains is a medical test on 25 January. Dinamo coach Kruno Jurčić stated "He is a winger who can play on both sides and he's the kind of player we need. I've seen him when I was working for Croatian national team and was scouting Macedonia so when an opportunity came to sign him we didn't hesitate". But the transfer failed.

With the Wolfsburg squad being reduced and not receiving much match time, Hasani planned to leave in the summer, with possible interests from Dynamo Dresden and Brøndby.

Brøndby IF

2013–14 season
On 2 September 2013, Hasani decided to join Brøndby IF. According to Danish media the transfer fee was €260K. He signed a two-year contract and was presented the jersey number 22. Hasani debuted on 15 September 2013 and scored his first goal after only two minutes of play, as he became matchwinner with a goal in the 65th minute against Odense Boldklub. On 1 December 2013, Hasani scored from a freekick 25 metres out from the goal against city rivals F.C. København.

After round 23 in the Superliga, Ferhan sustained a knee injury, keeping him out of the next three games. On 18 April, he was cleared to return for the game against SønderjyskE. Ferhan came off the bench in the 70th minute, and put the game away when he score the third goal for Brøndby in the 88th minute.  Hasani's goal came on a right footed shot to the right corner past the diving keeper of SønderjyskE.

2014–15 season 
After a successful pre-season, in which he scored against Liverpool, Hasani succumbed to injury missing out on the beginning of the season.

On 7 December, Hasani returned and Brøndby defeated Silkeborg IF 1–0. Hasani scored the goal on what was the 50th anniversary of Brøndby. Ferhan had a successful season with Brøndby reaching third in the Superliga.

Return to Shkëndija
After completing his two-year contract at Brøndby, Hasani's agent Fali Ramadani and Brøndby could not agree on a new deal resulting in Hasani leaving during the summer transfer period. A fan favourite, Brøndby fans had been writing for weeks for Hasani to extend his contract. Ferhan was given flowers by Brøndby when they hosted Esbjerg in the final round of the Danish season.

Hasani agreed a three-year deal with Shkëndija. Hasani joined the squad heading into the Europa League fixtures against Aberdeen.

In the 2017–18 season, Ferhan led Shkëndija to winning the league and cup. He scored 22 goals in 27 matches and made 15 assists. With his contract over and achieve all trophies in the league, it is suspected that Ferhan will leave, with interest from Galatasaray.

Al-Ra'ed
On 17 August 2018, Hasani agreed to terms with Saudi Arabian side Al-Ra'ed.

HJK
On 18 October 2019, HJK announced the signing of Hasani on a one-year contract.

Partizani Tirana
On 26 January 2021, he signed for FK Partizani.

Second return to Shkëndija
On 6 January 2022, he returned to Shkëndija once again.

International career
Hasani made his full international debut on 22 December 2010 against China in a friendly match. At the end of the football season, Hasani was called up to the Macedonian squad for the upcoming fixture with Ireland for the UEFA Euro 2012 qualifiers. He came on as a substitute in the tenth minute and Macedonia went on to lose 0–2 to Ireland. With Macedonia effectively out of the qualifications of the UEFA Euro 2012, Hasani was called to play for the Under-21s team against Serbia for the UEFA European Under-21 Football Championship qualifiers. Hasani was crucial as he scored for Macedonia, resulting in a 1–1 draw.

On 29 February 2012, Hasani scored his first goal in an away friendly against Luxembourg as Macedonia suffered a 1–2 defeat.

Career statistics

Scores and results list North Macedonia's goal tally first, score column indicates score after each Hasani goal.

Honours
Shkendija
Macedonian First League: 2010–11, 2017–18
Macedonian Football Cup: 2015–16, 2017-18
Macedonian Super Cup: 2010–11

Individual
Macedonian Footballer of the Year (domestic league): 2011

References

External links
 Profile at Macedonian Football 

1990 births
Living people
Sportspeople from Tetovo
Albanian footballers from North Macedonia
Association football wingers
Macedonian footballers
North Macedonia youth international footballers
North Macedonia under-21 international footballers
North Macedonia international footballers
KF Shkëndija players
VfL Wolfsburg players
Brøndby IF players
Al-Raed FC players
Helsingin Jalkapalloklubi players
Macedonian First Football League players
Bundesliga players
Danish Superliga players
Saudi Professional League players
Veikkausliiga players
UEFA Euro 2020 players
Macedonian expatriate footballers
Expatriate footballers in Germany
Macedonian expatriate sportspeople in Germany
Expatriate men's footballers in Denmark
Macedonian expatriate sportspeople in Denmark
Expatriate footballers in Saudi Arabia
Macedonian expatriate sportspeople in Saudi Arabia
Expatriate footballers in Finland
Macedonian expatriate sportspeople in Finland